A municipal bus company is an operator of bus services owned by the local government authority. This article lists all current municipal bus companies in the United Kingdom.

Most municipal bus companies disappeared between 1968 and 1974 before (or with) the formation of PTE bus operations.

Of the remaining municipal operators, post-1986 many were sold off or collapsed in the process of bus deregulation, which required their separation into stand-alone arms-length companies. A few remaining companies have accepted minority-stake holdings in their companies by private bus operating companies, as a method of securing investment.

See also
Bus Vannin a municipal bus operator fully owned by the Isle of Man Government
East Thames Buses established and owned by Transport for London after deregulation
Former municipal bus companies of the United Kingdom
History of the PTE bus operations
List of bus operating companies
List of bus companies of the United Kingdom
London Buses a municipal body owned by Transport for London that regulates bus services operated by private companies
Uno Bus a bus company fully owned by the state owned University of Hertfordshire
Wightbus established and owned by the Isle of Wight Council after deregulation

References

Bus transport in the United Kingdom
Companies owned by municipalities of the United Kingdom